Ihor Serhiovych Chernomor (born 25 February 1985) is a Ukrainian football defender currently playing for Ukrainian Second League club Krystal Kherson.

Club history
Ihor Chernomor transferred to FC Kremin Kremenchuk during 2009 winter transfer window.

Career statistics

References

External links
 Profile – Moldova Sport
 Profile – Official Kremin site 
 FC Kremin Kremenchuk Squad on the PFL website 
 Profile on the FFU website 

1985 births
Living people
FC Kremin Kremenchuk players
FC Krystal Kherson players
Ukrainian footballers
Ukrainian expatriate footballers
Expatriate footballers in Moldova

Association football defenders